Fred George Martin (13 May 1929 – 20 August 2013) was a Scottish professional footballer, who played as a goalkeeper. His only senior club was Aberdeen, with whom he played for 14 years. He also represented Scotland during their first FIFA World Cup finals appearance in 1954.

Club career
Originally signed from Carnoustie Panmure as an inside forward, Martin was converted into a goalkeeper during his period of National Service. He made his Aberdeen debut in his new position in a 3–1 defeat by East Fife in 1949–50, scoring an own goal when he fumbled a last minute cross into his net. He recovered from this start and became a regular over the next seven seasons, helping the Dons to their first League title in 1954–55 and the 1955–56 League Cup. Martin also featured in three Scottish Cup finals for the Reds (1952–53, 1953–54 and 1958–59), although he was on the losing side on each occasion. The latter years of his time at Pittodrie saw Martin fall victim to a succession of injuries and after making only four appearances during the season, he retired at the end of the 1959–60 campaign.

Scotland career
Martin was chosen to represent the Scottish Football League in 1952 and two years later earned his first full Scotland cap in a 1–0 win against Norway, making his debut alongside Dons teammates Paddy Buckley and George Hamilton. He was selected in the Scotland squad for the 1954 World Cup and played in both Scotland's matches, a 1–0 defeat by Austria and a 7–0 defeat by Uruguay. Martin was considered partially responsible for scale of the Uruguayan defeat and dropped, with his inconsistency being highlighted in the media. In the opinion of Scottish football journalist and historian Bob Crampsey "when the mood was upon him, he could be very good, but at other times, played exactly as you would expect an inside-right to play if shoved between the posts."

Martin was recalled for games against Hungary and England in late 1954 and early 1955 but on each occasion Scotland lost heavily (4–2 and 7–2 respectively) and his international career was effectively over. He conceded a total of 20 goals in his six games for Scotland.

Post football
After retiring from football, Martin went into the whisky trade and worked for Dewar's Whisky until he retired in 1994. In 2007, he was one of the inaugural inductees into the Aberdeen Football Club Hall of Fame in recognition of his achievements and legendary status at the club. He died in August 2013 at the age of 84.

Career statistics

Club

International

See also 
List of one-club men

References

External links
Scotland appearances at londonhearts.com Scotland section

1929 births
1954 FIFA World Cup players
2013 deaths
Aberdeen F.C. players
Association football goalkeepers
Association football inside forwards
Carnoustie Panmure F.C. players
People from Carnoustie
Scotland international footballers
Scottish Junior Football Association players
Scottish Football League players
Scottish Football League representative players
Scottish footballers
Footballers from Angus, Scotland